Petra Marčinko (born 4 December 2005) is a Croatian tennis player.

Marčinko has career-high WTA rankings of 194 in singles, achieved on 7 November 2022, and 819 in doubles, set on 7 November 2022. She has won three singles and two doubles titles on the ITF Women's Circuit.

Marčinko has won nine singles titles as well as seven doubles titles on the ITF Junior Circuit. She achieved her career-high junior ranking of No. 1 on 13 December 2021.

In December 2021, she completed a remarkable late-season surge as singles and doubles victories at the prestigious Orange Bowl Junior Tennis Championships saw her climb nine places to finish as the year-end junior world No. 1.

At the beginning of 2022, Marčinko won her first junior Grand Slam title at the Australian Open, defeating Sofia Costoulas in straight sets.

sq:Petra Marčinko

Performance timelines

Singles

ITF Circuit finals

Singles: 3 (3 titles)

Doubles: 3 (2 titles, 1 runner-up)

Junior Grand Slam finals

Girls' singles: 1 (1 title)

Fed Cup participation

Singles (5–1)

Doubles (0–1)

United Cup participation

Doubles (0–1)

References

External links
 
 

2005 births
Living people
Tennis players from Zagreb
Croatian female tennis players
Grand Slam (tennis) champions in girls' singles
Australian Open (tennis) junior champions
21st-century Croatian women